The Typhoon is a 1914 American drama film directed by Reginald Barker, written by Melchior Lengyel, and starring Sessue Hayakawa, Gladys Brockwell, Frank Borzage, Henry Kotani and Leona Hutton. It was released on October 10, 1914, by Paramount Pictures.

Plot
Romantic tragedy about a young Japanese man and a Parisian actress.

Cast  
Sessue Hayakawa as Tokorama
Gladys Brockwell as Helene
Frank Borzage as Renard Bernisky
Henry Kotani as Hironari
Leona Hutton as Theresa
Kisaburo Kurihara as Baron Joshikawa
Tsuru Aoki

See also
Typhoon (1933)

References

External links 
 

1914 films
1910s English-language films
Silent American drama films
1914 drama films
Paramount Pictures films
American black-and-white films
American silent feature films
Films directed by Reginald Barker
1910s American films